WBNO-FM (100.9 FM) is a radio station licensed to Bryan, Ohio, United States.  The station is currently owned by Impact Radio, LLC.  WBNO-FM broadcasts a classic rock music format, switching from adult contemporary during the summer of 2013.

WBNO had carried the Classic Hits format from Dial Global until that format was discontinued on June 17, 2012.

Previous logo
This was the previous logo:

References

External links

BNO-FM
Classic rock radio stations in the United States
1966 establishments in Ohio
Radio stations established in 1966